Abies numidica, the Algerian fir, is a species of fir found only in Algeria, where it is endemic on Djebel Babor, the second-highest mountain (2,004 meters) in the Algerian Tell Atlas.

Description
Abies numidica is a medium-sized to large evergreen tree growing to 20–35 meters tall, with a trunk up to 1 meter diameter. The leaves are needle-like, moderately flattened, 1.5–2.5 centimeters long and 2–3 millimeters wide by 1 millimeters thick, glossy dark green with a patch of greenish-white stomata near the tip above, and with two greenish-white bands of stomata below. The tip of the leaf is variable, usually pointed, but sometimes slightly notched at the tip, particularly on slow-growing shoots on older trees. The cones are glaucous green with a pink or violet tinge, maturing brown, 10–20 centimeters long and 4 centimeters broad, with about 150–200 scales, each scale with a short bract (not visible on the closed cone) and two winged seeds; they disintegrate when mature to release the seeds.

Distribution
Abies numidica grows in a high-altitude Mediterranean climate at 1,800–2,004 meters (and rarely down to 1,220 meters) with an annual precipitation of 1,500–2,000 milliliters, the great majority of which falls as winter snow; the summers are warm and very dry. It is closely related to Abies pinsapo (Spanish fir), which occurs further west in the Rif mountains of Morocco and in southern Spain.

Cultivation and uses
Algerian fir, Abies numidica, is occasionally grown as an ornamental tree in parks and larger gardens. It is valued among firs for its drought tolerance.

References

numidica
Endemic flora of Algeria
Critically endangered flora of Africa
Garden plants of Africa
Ornamental trees
Drought-tolerant trees
Taxonomy articles created by Polbot
Taxa named by Élie-Abel Carrière